Winnipeg Centre is a federal electoral district in Manitoba, Canada, that has been represented in the House of Commons of Canada from 1917 to 1925 and since 1997.

History
This riding was originally created in 1914 from Winnipeg and Selkirk ridings.

In 1924, it was abolished, and parts transferred to Winnipeg North Centre and Winnipeg South Centre ridings.

In 1997, it was re-created from Winnipeg North Centre and Winnipeg South Centre.

This riding was left unchanged after the 2012 electoral redistribution.

Members of Parliament

This riding has elected the following Members of Parliament:

Election results

1997–present

1917–1925

See also
 List of Canadian federal electoral districts
 Past Canadian electoral districts

References

Notes

External links
 Riding history for Winnipeg Centre (1914–1924) from the Library of Parliament
 Riding history for Winnipeg Centre (1997– ) from the Library of Parliament
 Expenditures - 2008
Expenditures - 2004
 Website of the Parliament of Canada
Canada Votes 2006 - Winnipeg Centre

Manitoba federal electoral districts
Politics of Winnipeg
West End, Winnipeg